F68 may refer to:
 Farman F.68, a French aircraft
 , a Cunard ocean liner requisitioned for the Royal Navy